Gunnarsbosjön is a lake in Gävleborg County, Sweden. It is located to the north of lake Gryttjen.

References

External links
Names

Lakes of Gävleborg County